London hosted the Olympic Games in 1908, 1948 and 2012. The 2012 Summer Olympics made London the first city to have hosted the modern Games of three Olympiads. London is the only city in the United Kingdom to have ever hosted the Olympics; the United States is the only country to have hosted Summer Olympics on more occasions than the UK. Also, London is the only city to have bid more than once and still hold a 100% record.

British participation in Olympic events, both as a competitor and as a host, is the responsibility of the British Olympic Association.

1908 Summer Olympics 

The 1908 Summer Olympics (the Games of the IV Olympiad) were the fourth modern Olympic Games and the third to be hosted outside of Athens, Greece. The International Olympic Committee considers them the fourth Olympic Games, discounting the intercalated 1906 Summer Olympics. The 1908 Olympic Games were scheduled to take place in Rome, but the eruption of Mount Vesuvius on 7 April 1906 required the Italian government to redirect funds away from the Olympics. The events took place between 27 April 1908 and 31 October 1908, with 22 nations participating in 110 events. The British team easily topped the unofficial medal count, finishing with three times as many medals as the second-place United States.

1944 Summer Olympics 
The 1944 Summer Olympics (the Games of the XIII Olympiad) were scheduled to be held in London. Awarded in 1939, they were, however, cancelled due to World War II. These Games would have celebrated the 50th anniversary of the Modern Olympiad.

1948 Summer Olympics 

The 1948 Summer Olympics (the Games of the XIV Olympiad) were the first to be held after World War II, with the 1944 Summer Olympics having been cancelled due to the war. Showing a collective unity after the war, 59 nations competed in 136 different events between 29 July 1948 and 14 August 1948. Germany and Japan were not invited to the games due to security reasons. Unlike the previous time the UK hosted the Olympics, the British athletes did not have a high medal count, finishing 12th in the unofficial medal count with only 21 medals.

2012 Summer Olympics 

The 2012 Summer Olympics (the Games of the XXX Olympiad) took place between 27 July 2012 and 12 August 2012. The London 2012 Olympic bid was announced as the winner of the bidding process on 6 July 2005, following unsuccessful bid attempts for previous Olympics by Manchester and Birmingham. Team GB finished 3rd with 29 Gold medals, and 65 total medals, representing their best medal haul since London first hosted the Olympics in 1908.

2012 Summer Paralympics 

The 2012 Summer Paralympics were the fourteenth Paralympics and took place between 29 August 2012 and 9 September 2012 at the Summer Olympics venues in London.

External links 
 London 2012 Olympic Games official website
 London 2012 Olympic Games Information Portal
 Commentary on 2012 Olympic Park